A talaiot, or talayot, is a Bronze Age megalith found on the islands of Menorca and Majorca forming part of the Talaiotic Culture or Talaiotic Period. Talaiots date back to the late second millennium and early first millennium BC. There are at least 274 of them, in, near, or related to Talaiotic settlements and the Talaiotic chamber tombs known as navetas. Talaiots pre-date the megalithic structures known as taulas, which are usually found nearby. While some Talaiots are thought to have had a defensive purpose, the use of others is not clearly understood. Some believe them to have served the purpose of lookout or signalling towers, as on Menorca, where they form a network. Talaiots generally take the form of circular or square buildings, and they may have been used as dwellings or meeting places. The talayots on Menorca have been much less prone to weathering than the ones found on Majorca. Despite this, very few grave goods have been found in Menorcan talayots, leading historians to believe that the island had a poorer economy than its larger neighbor.

The first author to write about these structures was Juan Ramis in his book Celtic antiquities on the island of Menorca, which was published in 1818, and was the first book in the Spanish language entirely devoted to prehistory.

There are similar megalithic buildings found in other areas of the Western Mediterranean, though these are not necessarily related to talaiots. Examples include the "nuraghes" of Sardinia, the "torri" of Corsica, and the "sesi" of Pantelleria.

Sites 

Talaiotic sites include:
Capocorb Vell, 12 km south of Llucmajor, Majorca: five talaiots and ancient village
Ses Païsses, near Artà, Majorca
Son Oleza dolmen, Majorca, discovered in 1999 
Bocchoris, Majorca 
Settlement at S'illot, Majorca
Talatí de Dalt, Menorca
Trebalúger, Menorca,  dating from around 1500–100 BC: one of the oldest Talaiots on Menorca
Trepucó, Menorca
Torre d'en Galmés, Menorca

Archaeology 
In 2019 a well-preserved 3,200-year-old Bronze Age sword was discovered by archaeologists under the leadership of Jaume Deya and Pablo Galera at the Talaiot del Serral de ses Abelles in the Puigpunyent municipality of western Majorca. The archaeologists believe that the weapon was made when the Talaiotic culture was in decline. The sword will be on display at the Majorca Museum.

See also
Gymnesian Islands
Naveta
Idjang

Sources

External links

 Megalithic Menorca. Discovering Menorca
 Guide to Menorca: Prehistory 
 Talayots.es - Comprehensive site for prehistoric monuments in Mallorca and Menorca (in Spanish)

Archaeological sites in Spain
Megalithic monuments in Spain
Bronze Age Spain
Prehistory of the Balearic Islands
Mallorca
Menorca
Archaeological cultures in Spain